Notting Hill is a 1999 romantic comedy film directed by Roger Michell. The screenplay was written by Richard Curtis, and the film was produced by Duncan Kenworthy. It stars Julia Roberts and Hugh Grant, with Rhys Ifans, Emma Chambers, Tim McInnerny, Gina McKee, and Hugh Bonneville in supporting roles. The story is of a romance between a London bookseller (Grant) and a famous American actress (Roberts) who happens to walk into his shop.

Released on 21 May 1999, Notting Hill was well-received by critics and became the highest-grossing British film of all time. It was nominated for the Golden Globe Award for Best Motion Picture – Musical or Comedy, with Roberts and Grant also receiving nominations for their performances. It also earned two BAFTA nominations, and won a British Comedy Award and a Brit Award for its soundtrack.

Plot
William Thacker owns a travel book store in Notting Hill, London. Divorced, Will shares a flat with Spike, a flaky and sloppy Welshman. One day, famous Hollywood actress Anna Scott enters the shop and buys a book. Shortly after she leaves, Will bumps into her while rounding a street corner, spilling his juice on her. He takes Anna to his flat that is directly across the street so she can change into something clean. When leaving, she impulsively kisses him.

Anna later invites him to visit her at the Ritz Hotel. Upon his arrival he is mistaken for a reporter and ushered into a press junket for her new film. When asked, he says he writes for Horse & Hound magazine. Anna asks to be William's date at his sister's birthday party later that evening. Though his friends and family are surprised, Anna gets on well with everyone and enjoys herself. Later, the two enter a private neighbourhood park, where Anna again kisses Will.

At a restaurant the next day, Will and Anna overhear six men at a nearby table discussing her, first praising and then disparaging her and equating actresses to prostitutes. Will confronts them, then she introduces herself and calmly insults the stunned foursome.

Anna invites Will to her hotel room, but he quickly leaves after discovering that her movie star boyfriend, Jeff King, has unexpectedly arrived from America. Over the next six months, Will's friends arrange a series of dates for him, but Will, unable to forget Anna, is uninterested in another relationship.

One day, a distraught Anna appears at Will's doorstep, needing to hide from a tabloid scandal. She apologises about King and says their relationship is over. They discover shared interests, and discuss Will's print of Marc Chagall's 1950 painting La Mariée. They make love that night. The next morning, paparazzi, inadvertently tipped off by Spike, besiege the house and take photos of Will, Anna, and a half-dressed Spike at the front door. Furious, she blames Will and leaves.

Several seasons pass, and Will remains miserable. When he discovers Anna is back in London making a film based on a Henry James novel, something he had suggested, he visits the set unannounced. She asks him to wait until shooting is done, but he leaves after overhearing her being dismissive about him to another actor. Anna comes to the bookshop the next day, bringing a wrapped gift. Will says he overheard what she said about him to her co-star. She explains that she was merely keeping her personal life private from another actor. She proclaims that she loves him, and pleads to rekindle their relationship. Will says no, explaining he would be too hurt if she left him again.

Will meets his friends and sister at a restaurant with Anna's partly opened gift: Chagall's original La Mariée ("The Bride"). They half-heartedly support his decision about Anna until Spike arrives and calls him a "daft prick". Will admits his mistake, and everyone races across London to find Anna, who is holding a press conference at the Savoy Hotel. Will arrives just as her publicist answers a reporter's question and announces that Anna is taking a year off and is leaving the UK that night.

A reporter asks about the embarrassing photographs taken at Will's flat, and Anna says they are just friends. Will, again pretending to be a Horse & Hound reporter, asks her if she would consider being more than friends if Thacker begged her forgiveness. She says she would, then requests that the reporter repeat the question "How long do you plan to stay in England?". Smiling, she answers "indefinitely".

Anna and Will marry and she is now pregnant. They spend time in the private park that they had visited on their first date.

Cast

 Julia Roberts as Anna Scott
 Hugh Grant as William "Will" Thacker
 Hugh Bonneville as Bernie
 Emma Chambers as Honey Thacker
 James Dreyfus as Martin
 Rhys Ifans as Spike
 Tim McInnerny as Max
 Gina McKee as Bella
 Richard McCabe as Tony
 Dylan Moran as Rufus, the thief
 Henry Goodman as the Ritz concierge
 Julian Rhind-Tutt as Time Out journalist
 Lorelei King as Karen, Anna's publicist
 John Shrapnel as Anna's UK press agent
 Clarke Peters as Helix lead actor
 Arturo Venegas as actor in Helix
 Yolanda Vazquez as interpreter
 Mischa Barton as 12-year-old actress in Helix
 Emily Mortimer as Perfect Girl
 Samuel West as Anna's co-star (as Sam West)
 Ann Beach as William's mother
 Patrick Barlow as Savoy concierge

Uncredited cast

 Alec Baldwin as Jeff King
 Simon Callow as himself in Film-within-Film
 Joe Cornish as Fan Receiving Anna's Autograph
 Matthew Modine as Actor in Film-within-Film
 Sally Phillips as Caroline (scenes deleted)

Casting notes
 Julia Roberts was the "one and only" choice for the role of Anna Scott, although Roger Michell and Duncan Kenworthy did not expect her to accept. Her agent told her it was "the best romantic comedy she had ever read". Roberts said that after reading the script she decided she was "going to have to do this".
 The decision to cast Hugh Grant as William Thacker was unanimous, as he and Richard Curtis had a "writer/actor marriage made in heaven". Michell said that "Hugh does Richard better than anyone else, and Richard writes Hugh better than anyone else", and that Grant is "one of the only actors who can speak Richard's lines perfectly".
 Mischa Barton appears as the child actor whom Will interviews for Horse & Hound.
 The casting of Bonneville, McInnerny, McKee, Chambers, and Ifans as Will's friends was "rather like assembling a family". Michell explained, "When you are casting a cabal of friends, you have to cast a balance of qualities, of types and of sensibilities. They were the jigsaw that had to be put together all in one go, and I think we've got a very good variety of people who can realistically still live in the same world."
 Sanjeev Bhaskar has a cameo role as a loud and offensive restaurant patron (who refers to Meg Ryan as "the actress who has an orgasm every time she's taken out for a cup of coffee") in the restaurant Anna and Will visit.
 Omid Djalili makes an uncredited cameo as the vendor who sells Will the orange juice that Will accidentally spills on Anna moments later.
 Science fiction author China Miéville was cast as an extra in the film, which he humorously described as a dystopian alternate history of an ethnically-cleansed city.

Production

Richard Curtis developed the film from thoughts while lying awake at night. He described the starting point as "the idea of a very normal person going out with an unbelievably famous person and how that impinges on their lives". In an interview with GQ in 2018, Hugh Grant claimed the film was based on real life and loosely followed a friend of Richard's who fell in love with an 'extremely world-famous person who [Grant wasn't] allowed to mention'. Much like the film, Curtis's friend was an everyday person who met the well known celebrity in a shop (Harrods) and they ended up having a relationship.

The film has been likened to "a 90s London-set version of Roman Holiday". However, Curtis has said that he had not seen the 1953 film.

Four Weddings and a Funeral director Mike Newell was approached but rejected it to work on Pushing Tin. He said that in commercial terms he had made the wrong decision, but did not regret it. The producer, Duncan Kenworthy, then turned to Roger Michell, saying that "Finding someone as good as Roger, was just like finding the right actor to play each role. Roger shone out."

Nicole Kidman fought to get the role of Anna Scott, but she was told that she wasn’t talented enough.

Curtis chose Notting Hill as he lived there and knew the area, saying "Notting Hill is a melting pot and the perfect place to set a film". This left the producers to film in a heavily populated area. Kenworthy noted "Early on, we toyed with the idea of building a huge exterior set. That way we would have more control, because we were worried about having Roberts and Grant on public streets where we could get thousands of onlookers." In the end they decided to film in the streets. Michell was worried "that Hugh and Julia were going to turn up on the first day of shooting on Portobello Road, and there would be gridlock and we would be surrounded by thousands of people and paparazzi photographers who would prevent us from shooting". The location team and security personnel prevented this, as well as preventing problems the presence of a film crew might have caused the residents of Notting Hill, who Michell believes were "genuinely excited" about the film. Location manager Sue Quinn described finding locations and getting permission to film as "a mammoth task". Quinn and the rest of her team had to write to thousands of people in the area, promising to donate to each person's favourite charity, resulting in 200 charities receiving money.

Stuart Craig, the production designer, was pleased to do a contemporary film, saying "we're dealing with streets with thousands of people, market traders, shop owners and residents which makes it really complex". Filming began on 17 April 1998 in West London and at Shepperton Studios. Will's bookshop was on Portobello Road, one of the main areas in which filming took place. Other places within Notting Hill included Westbourne Park Road, Golborne Road, Landsdowne Road and the Coronet Cinema. Will's house, 280 Westbourne Park Road, was owned by Richard Curtis and behind the entrance there is a grand house, not the flat in the film that was made up in the studios. The blue door was auctioned for charity. The current door is blue again. The Travel Book Store is located at 142 Portobello Road. After filming for six weeks in Notting Hill, filming moved to the Ritz Hotel, where it had to take place at night. Other locations were Savoy Hotel, the Nobu Restaurant, the Zen Garden of the Hempel Hotel, and Kenwood House. 

One of the final scenes takes place at a film premiere, which presented difficulties. Michell wanted to film at Leicester Square but was declined. Police had found fans at a Leonardo DiCaprio premiere problematic and were concerned the same might occur at the staged premiere. Through a health and safety act, the production received permission to film and constructed the scene in 24 hours. Interior scenes were the last to be filmed, at Shepperton Studios. The final cut was 3.5 hours long; 90 minutes were edited out for release.

The film features the 1950 Marc Chagall painting La Mariée ("The Bride"). Anna sees a print of the painting in William's home and later gives him what is presumably the original. Michell said in Entertainment Weekly that the painting was chosen because Curtis was a fan of Chagall's work and because La Mariée "depicts a yearning for something that's lost." The producers had a reproduction made for the film, but had to get permission from the owner as well as clearance from the Design and Artists Copyright Society. Finally, according to Kenworthy, "we had to agree to destroy it. They were concerned that if our fake was too good, it might float around the market and create problems." The article also noted that "some experts say the real canvas could be worth between US$500,000 and US$1million."

The film features the book Istanbul: The Imperial City (1996) by John Freely. William recommends this book to Anna, commenting that (unlike another book in the store) the author has at least been to Istanbul. In reality, Freely taught at Boğaziçi University in Istanbul, and was the author of nine books about the city.

In the film's last scene, Will is shown reading the 1994 book Captain Corelli's Mandolin by Louis de Bernières. This was to have been Roger Michell's next film, but a heart attack forced him to withdraw from the production.

Soundtrack

Original music was composed by Trevor Jones. A main score was written, and excerpts were used throughout the film. The score was broken down into two songs for the soundtrack (Will and Anna/Notting Hill). Several additional songs written by other artists include Elvis Costello's cover of the Charles Aznavour song "She". Charles Aznavour's original version can be heard during the opening credits while Elvis Costello's version is played at the end of the movie (before the end credits). Other songs are Shania Twain's remixed version of "You've Got a Way", as well as Ronan Keating's specially recorded cover of "When You Say Nothing at All"; the song reached number one in the British charts. Pulp recorded a new song "Born to Cry", which was released on the European version of the soundtrack album.

The song played when Will strides down Portobello Road is "Ain't No Sunshine" by Bill Withers. Tony and Bernie play "Blue Moon" on the piano at Tony's restaurant on the night it closes. Originally, Charles Aznavour's version of "She" was used in the film, but American test screening audiences did not respond to it. Costello was then brought in by Richard Curtis to record a cover version of the song. Both versions of the song appear in non-US releases.

The soundtrack album was released by Island Records.

US version track listing
Catalog #314 546 196-2

 "No Matter What"– Boyzone (4:33)
 "You've Got a Way" (Notting Hill remix)– Shania Twain (3:21)
 "I Do (Cherish You)"– 98° (3:45)
 "She"– Elvis Costello (3:06)
 "Ain't No Sunshine"– Bill Withers (2:03)
 "How Can You Mend a Broken Heart"– Al Green (6:24)
 "Gimme Some Lovin'"– The Spencer Davis Group (2:57)
 "When You Say Nothing at All"- Ronan Keating (4:14)
 "Ain't No Sunshine"– Lighthouse Family (3:41)
 "From the Heart"- Another Level (4:51)
 "Everything About You (remix)"- Steve Poltz (3:55)
 "Will and Anna"– Trevor Jones (Score) (3:35)
 "Notting Hill"– Trevor Jones (Score) (4:45)

UK/EU version track listing
Catalog #314 546 428-2

 "From the Heart"- Another Level (4:51)
 "When You Say Nothing at All"- Ronan Keating (4:14)
 "She"– Elvis Costello (3:06)
 "How Can You Mend a Broken Heart"– Al Green (6:24)
 "In Our Lifetime"–Texas (4:06)
 "I Do (Cherish You)"– 98° (3:45)
 "Born To Cry"– Pulp (5:33)
 "Ain't No Sunshine"– Lighthouse Family (3:41)
 "You've Got a Way" (Notting Hill remix)– Shania Twain (3:21)
 "Gimme Some Lovin'"– The Spencer Davis Group (2:57)
 "Will and Anna"– Trevor Jones (Score) (3:35)
 "Notting Hill"– Trevor Jones (Score) (4:45)
 "Ain't No Sunshine"– Bill Withers (2:03)

The film score and original music was recorded and mixed by Gareth Cousins (who also mixed all the songs used in the film) and Simon Rhodes.

Release
The film premiered at the Odeon Leicester Square on 27 April 1999 and opened in the UK on 21 May 1999 and in the United States the following week.

Critical reception
On Rotten Tomatoes the film holds an approval rating of 84% based on 105 reviews, with an average rating of 7.1/10. The website's critical consensus reads: "A rom-com with the right ingredients, Notting Hill proves there's nothing like a love story well told—especially when Hugh Grant and Julia Roberts are your leads." On Metacritic the film has a weighted average score of 68 out of 100 based on 34 critics, indicating "generally favourable reviews". Audiences polled by CinemaScore gave the film an average grade of "B+" on an A+ to F scale.

Variety'''s Derek Elley said that "It's slick, it's gawky, it's 10 minutes too long, and it's certainly not "Four Weddings and a Funeral Part 2" in either construction or overall tone", giving it an overall positive review. Cranky Critic called it "Bloody damned good", as well as saying that it was "A perfect date flick." Nitrate said that "Notting Hill is whimsical and light, fresh and quirky", with "endearing moments and memorable characters". In his review of the film's DVD John J. Puccio noted that "the movie is a fairy tale, and writer Richard Curtis knows how much the public loves a fairy tale", calling it "a sweet film". Desson Howe of The Washington Post gave the film a very positive review, particularly praising Rhys Ifans' performance as Spike. James Sanford gave Notting Hill three and a half stars, saying that "Curtis' dialogue may be much snappier than his sometimes dawdling plot, but the first hour of Notting Hill is so beguiling and consistently funny it seems churlish to complain that the rest is merely good." Sue Pierman of the Milwaukee Journal Sentinel stated that "Notting Hill is clever, funny, romantic—and oh, yes, reminiscent of Four Weddings and a Funeral", but that the film "is so satisfying, it doesn't pay to nitpick." Roger Ebert praised the film, saying "The movie is bright, the dialogue has wit and intelligence, and Roberts and Grant are very easy to like." Kenneth Turan gave a good review, concluding that "the film's romantic core is impervious to problems". CNN reviewer Paul Clinton said that Notting Hill "stands alone as another funny and heartwarming story about love against all odds".

Widgett Walls of Needcoffee.com gave the film "three and a half cups of coffee", stating, "The humor of the film saves it from a completely trite and unsatisfying (nay, shall I say enraging) ending", but criticising the soundtrack. Dennis Schwartz gave the film a negative review with a grade of "C−", writing, "This film was pure and unadulterated balderdash". Some criticised the film for giving a "sweetened unrealistic view of London life and British eccentricity". The Independent derided the film as "unrealistic". It was also criticised for failing to reflect the area's demographic: "Only Curtis could write a movie about Notting Hill, London's most diverse borough, and not feature a single black face in it."

ListsNotting Hill was 95th on the British Film Institute's "list of the all-time top 100 films", based on estimates of each film's British cinema admissions.

Box office
The film opened over the Memorial Day weekend in the United States and Canada, the same weekend as Star Wars: Episode I – The Phantom Menace, and opened at number two for the four-day weekend, grossing US$27.7million, the biggest opening for a romantic comedy film, beating My Best Friend's Wedding (which also starred Julia Roberts). It made another US$15million the following week. One month after its release, it lost its record for highest-grossing opening weekend for a romantic comedy film to Runaway Bride (again starring Roberts). Notting Hill grossed £31 million in the United Kingdom (the second highest-grossing film of 1999 behind The Phantom Menace) and US$116,089,678 in the United States and Canada (the 16th highest-grossing film of 1999), with a worldwide gross of US$363,889,678, making it the highest-grossing British film of all time, surpassing the record set by Four Weddings and a Funeral in 1994 (also starring Hugh Grant), and the seventh highest-grossing film of 1999.

Awards and nominationsNotting Hill won the Audience Award for Most Popular Film at the BAFTAs in 2000, and was nominated in the categories of The Alexander Korda Award for Outstanding British Film of the Year, and Best Performance by an Actor in a Supporting Role for Rhys Ifans. It won Best Comedy Film at the British Comedy Awards. Its soundtrack won Best Soundtrack at the 2000 Brit Awards, beating Star Wars: Episode I – The Phantom Menace''. It won Best British Film, Best British Director for Roger Michell, and Best British Actor for Hugh Grant at the Empire Awards.
It received three nominations at the Golden Globes, in the categories Best Motion Picture– Comedy/Musical, Best Motion Picture Actor– Comedy/Musical for Hugh Grant, and Best Motion Picture Actress– Comedy/Musical for Julia Roberts.

References

External links

 
 
 
 
 
 
 

1999 romantic comedy-drama films
American romantic comedy-drama films
British romantic comedy-drama films
1990s English-language films
Films about actors
Films about tabloid journalism
Films directed by Roger Michell
Films scored by Trevor Jones
Films set in London
Films shot in London
Films with screenplays by Richard Curtis
PolyGram Filmed Entertainment films
Universal Pictures films
Working Title Films films
Films about the mass media in the United Kingdom
Films set in bookstores
Films set in a movie theatre
1990s American films
1990s British films
Films about paraplegics or quadriplegics